Virginie Barbet (1824–1883) was a French anarchist and supporter of women's rights. A proponent of social democracy in Lyon in the late 1860s, she joined the International Alliance of Socialist Democracy with Mikhail Bakunin and participated in the Lyon section of the First International. She and other Lyon exiles lived in Geneva during the 1870s.

References 

1824 births
1883 deaths
French anarchists
French feminists
People from Lyon